Kaurismäki is a Finnish surname. Notable people with the surname include:

 Aki Kaurismäki (born 1957), Finnish film director and screenwriter, brother of Mika
 Mika Kaurismäki (born 1955), Finnish film director

Finnish-language surnames